The story of Mary Jones and her Bible inspired the founding of the British and Foreign Bible Society. Mary Jones (16 December 1784 – 28 December 1864) was a Welsh girl who, at the age of fifteen, walked twenty-six miles barefoot across the countryside to buy a copy of the Welsh Bible from Thomas Charles because she did not have one. Thomas Charles then used her story in proposing to the Religious Tract Society that it set up a new organisation to supply Wales with Bibles.

Together with the Welsh hymnwriter Ann Griffiths (1776–1805), Mary Jones had become a national icon by the end of the nineteenth century, and was a significant figure in Welsh nonconformism.

Journey 

Mary Jones was from a poor family, the daughter of a weaver, who lived at Llanfihangel-y-Pennant, Abergynolwyn, at the foot of Cader Idris near Dolgellau. She was born in December 1784. Her parents were devout Calvinistic Methodists, and she herself professed the Christian faith at eight years of age. Having learned to read in the circulating schools organised by Thomas Charles, it became her burning desire to possess a Bible of her own. Welsh Bibles were scarce in those days. Having saved for six years until she had enough money to pay for a copy, she started one morning in the Spring of 1800 for Bala, and walked the 26 miles over mountainous terrain, barefoot as usual, to obtain a copy from Thomas Charles, the only individual with Bibles for sale in the area. According to one version of the story, Charles told her that all of the copies which he had received were sold or already spoken for. Mary was so distraught that Charles spared her one of the copies which was already promised to another. In another version, she had to wait two days for a supply of Bibles to arrive, and was able to purchase a copy for herself and two other copies for members of her family. According to tradition, it was the impression that this visit by Mary Jones left upon him that impelled Charles to propose to the Council of the Religious Tract Society the formation of a Society to supply Wales with Bibles.

Mary later married a weaver named Thomas Jones. She died in 1864 aged 80 and was buried at the graveyard of Bryn-crug Calvinistic Methodist Chapel.

The Bibles

Two of Mary Jones' bibles are known, supporting the version of the story where she buys three books from Thomas Charles. One Bible is in the British and Foreign Bible Society's Archives in Cambridge University Library and one in the National Library of Wales. They are copies of the 1799 edition of the Welsh Bible, ten thousand copies of which were printed at Oxford for the Society for the Propagation of Christian Knowledge. In addition to the Old and New Testaments and the Apocrypha, the volume contains the Book of Common Prayer (in Welsh) and Edmwnd Prys's Welsh metrical Psalms.

In the copy now in Cambridge, Mary Jones wrote the following (in English) on the last page of the Apocrypha (spelling is her own):

The Cambridge copy of the bible was exhibited in Bala for 3 days in March 2016.

Published versions

The story of Mary Jones was published in the 7 December 1878 edition of The Sunday at Home: a family magazine for Sabbath reading. Robert Oliver Rees told the story in his 1879 Welsh-language book   (Mary Jones, the Welsh girl without a Bible : The organisation of the Bible Society). In 1882 an English version of the story was published, The story of Mary Jones and her Bible by Mary Emily Ropes (credited as "M.E.R."). This was reprinted several times, was translated into Japanese, Māori and Russian and is still in print.

Memorial in Llanfihangel-y-Pennant and legacy 

Incised on front lower part of a memorial obelisk erected over the ruin of the cottage where she lived (near north end of Pont Ty'n-y-fach) is this inscription:

A "Mary Jones Walk" was held in the year 2000 to commemorate Mary's journey, and has been repeated several times. Mary Jones World is a heritage centre open in the summer months which tells her story.

Further reading 

 Allchin, A. M.: 'Companions on the Way: Mary Jones, Ann Griffiths and Ruth Evans', Resurrection's Children (Norwich: Canterbury Press, 1998).
 Eade, Sara: 'Mary Jones', 2006.
 Eade, Sara: 'The world of Mary Jones: a social history of the people and places that Mary knew' (published by the author, 2015) 
 James, E. Wyn: 'Ann Griffiths, Mary Jones a Mecca'r Methodistiaid', Llên Cymru, 21 (1998) (Cardiff: Gwasg Prifysgol Cymru/University of Wales Press)
 James, E. Wyn: 'Bala and the Bible: Thomas Charles, Ann Griffiths and Mary Jones', Eusebeia: The Bulletin of the Jonathan Edwards Centre for Reformed Spirituality, 5 (Autumn 2005) (Toronto, Canada: Toronto Baptist Seminary and Bible College); reprinted in the Journal of the Merioneth Historical and Record Society, 15:2 (2007)
  A musical based on the story of Mary Jones and her Bible
 
 Williams, Elisabeth: To Bala for a Bible (Bridgend: Evangelical Press of Wales, 1988)

Notes

References

External links 
 James, E. Wyn: Bala and the Bible
  – location of her memorial
 Small exhibition of artefacts, records, etc., in Llanfihangel-y-Pennant church 
 'Mary Jones World' visitor centre, Bala: http://www.bydmaryjonesworld.org.uk/
 

1784 births
1864 deaths
History of Christianity in Wales
People from Gwynedd
1800 in Wales
1800 in Christianity